Fabio Gatti (born 4 January 1982) is an Italian footballer who plays as a midfielder for Lecco.

Club career
Gatti started his career at Perugia. He played twice for the club in the 2002 UEFA Intertoto Cup and once in Serie A before he left on loan to Catania. After the relegation of Perugia in 2004 he was sold to Napoli Soccer in Serie C1 in a co-ownership deal. He made 16 league appearances in his first season. After he played 4 league matches in first half of his second season, he was loaned to Cremonese of Serie B. He made 16 appearances as Cremonese were relegated in June. He returned to Napoli and helped them to promotion to Serie B as Serie C1 champion, and then Gatti made 19 starts as Napoli finished Serie B runner-up. In his final season he was completely ruled out from squad. In January 2008, he signed a short-term contract with Modena.

In September 2008, he signed a contract with hometown club Perugia at Prima Divisione. In January 2010 he was exchanged with Orlando Urbano, Filippo Forò and Giampietro Perrulli.

In January 2011 he was signed along with Urbano.

In July 2011 he left for Lecco.

International career
Gatti played 7 matches for Italy U21. He was called up to 2002 UEFA European Under-21 Football Championship, but did not play.

Honours
Perugia
UEFA Intertoto Cup: 2003

Napoli
Serie C1: 2005–06
Serie B (Serie A promotion): 2006–07

References

External links
Player Profile at La Gazzetta dello Sport website 
Profile at Football.it 
Profile at FIGC 

1982 births
Living people
Italian footballers
Italy under-21 international footballers
A.C. Perugia Calcio players
Catania S.S.D. players
U.S. Cremonese players
S.S.C. Napoli players
Modena F.C. players
L.R. Vicenza players
Calcio Lecco 1912 players
Serie A players
Serie B players
Serie C players
Association football midfielders
Sportspeople from Perugia
Footballers from Umbria